Kowdeh (also known as Ābādī) is a village in Jangal Rural District, Jangal District, Roshtkhar County, Razavi Khorasan Province, Iran. At the 2006 census, its population was 91, in 17 families.

References 

Populated places in Roshtkhar County